The M1 was a United States chemical landmine. It developed in 1939, and consisted of a one gallon (4.5 liter) gasoline can filled with 9.9 lbs (4.5 kg) of mustard gas agent. As issued, it had no bursting charge or fuze, but required a bursting charge of detonating cord to be attached via soldered tabs on the outside of the can.

References

Land mines of the United States
Chemical weapon delivery systems
Chemical weapons of the United States